Paran Bandopadhyay (alternate spelling Paran Bandyopadhyay or Paran Banerjee) is an Indian Bengali film, television and stage actor based in Kolkata. He has worked with Bengali film director Sandip Ray, the son of filmmaker and author Satyajit Ray.

Early life
Bandopadhyay has roots in Jessore, Bangladesh. His mother died when he was young and his father left home. After that, he was brought up by his paternal aunt in Dum Dum, Kolkata. He graduated from the City College at the University of Calcutta. In his childhood, Bandopadhyay participated in one-act plays in their neighborhood. He has also acted in some plays of the Indian People’s Theatre Association. In 1962, he was hired by the Government of West Bengal in the Department of Public Works Roads.

Cinema
Bandopadhyay retired from his Government job in 2000. At that time he was 60 years old. He was discovered by Sandip Ray in the late 1990s and his first work was a TV short named Shadhon Babur Shondeho, based on a story by Satyajit Ray and which was a part of a TV film series named Satyajiter Gappo in 1998. The series was made for DD Bangla.

Between 2000 and 2010, Bandopadhyay acted in more than 35 films. Some of his films are Bombaiyer Bombete (2003), Chiradin Chirakal (2016) Tintorettor Jishu (2008), Gosainbaganer Bhoot (2011), Royal Bengal Rahashya (2011), Jekhane Bhooter Bhoy (2012), Badshahi Angti (2014), Cinemawala (2016) and Double Feluda (2016).

Major productions of Shrutee Rangam
Tumi Kar
Bishmul
Satya Fire Eso
Mithyebadi
Jedin Sedin
Tobe Kamon Hoto
Promila Piyaji

Filmography

Films

Television
Janmabhoomi (as Dibakar) on DD Bangla
Shadhon Babur Shondeho (Satyajiter Gappo) (1998) on DD Bangla
Bateshworer Abodan-Satyajiter Priyo Galpo (2000) on ETV Bangla 
Songsar Sukher Hoy Romonir Gune ( 2012–2014) on Star Jalsha
Proloy Asche (2011) on Sananda TV
Nayika (2011–12) on Sananda TV
Boyei Gelo (2013–14) as Bhobhotash Basak on Zee Bangla
Byomkesh (2014–15) as Anukul Babu on Colors Bangla
Mirakkel as a judge  up to Season 9 on Zee Bangla

Web series

Holy Faak
Holy Faak Season 2
Shob Choritro (2022)
 Rudrabinar Abhisaap Season 2 (2022)

 Awards and nominations 
 2017 - Won for Filmfare Critics Award for Best Actor-Male - Bengali for Cinemawala 2017 - Won West Bengal Film Journalists' Association Awards for Best Actor in a Leading Role for Cinemawala 2020 - Won Films & Frames Digital Film Awards (Bangla) for Best Supporting Actor for Borunbabur Bondhu 2021 - Won West Bengal Film Journalists' Association Awards for Best Actor in a Supporting Role for Borunbabur Bondhu 2022 - Won West Bengal Film Journalists' Association Awards for Best Actor in a Leading Role for Tonic (film) 2022 - Won Filmfare Award for Best Actor in a Leading Role (Male) - Bangla for Tonic (film) 2022 - Nominated 67th Filmfare Awards Best Supporting Actor for Bob Biswas''

References

Citations

Notes

External links

Living people
Bengali male television actors
Indian People's Theatre Association people
Male actors in Bengali cinema
People from Jessore District
Male actors from Kolkata
City College, Kolkata alumni
University of Calcutta alumni
Indian male stage actors
Indian male film actors
20th-century Indian male actors
21st-century Indian male actors
1940 births